Ralph LeClair Claypool (December 15, 1898 – November 17, 1969) was an American football Center who played professionally for four seasons, from 1925 to 1928, with the Chicago Cardinals of the National Football League (NFL). Claypool played college football at Purdue University.

References

1898 births
1969 deaths
American football centers
Chicago Cardinals players
Purdue Boilermakers football players
People from Blue Grass, Iowa
Players of American football from Iowa